Canada national cerebral palsy football team is the national cerebral football team for Canada that represents the team in international competitions.  Canada has participated in a number of international tournaments and IFCPF World Championships. In the most recent edition they finished 10th, after losing their placement match to Scotland in extra time. They have appeared in one Paralympic Games, 1984.

Background 
Canadian Soccer Association oversees the national team.  The sport was originally governed by the Canadian Cerebral Palsy Sports Association. The Canadian Soccer Association (CSA) began governing the team  in 2005, with an initial player pool of 13 player. In 2011, the team was coached by Drew Ferguson.  In this early period under CSA governance, the team was coached by Drew Ferguson. The team held nine national team camps and mini camps in 2011. This totals  4,732 player camp days. By the end of the 2011, the player pool for the national team exceeded 100 players. By 2016, Canada had a national championships to support the national team and was active in participating in the IFCPF World Championships.

National team development is supported by an International Federation of Cerebral Palsy Football (IFCPF) recognized national championship.  Recognized years for the national IFCPF recognized competition include 2015.

Ranking 

Canada was ranked tenth in the world by the IFCPF in 2016. That same year, the team was also ranked fourth in the Americas. In August 2013 and November 2014, the team was ranked eleventh in the world. Canada was ranked twelfth in July 2011 and September 2012.

Players 
There have been a number of players for the Canadian squad.

Results 

Canada has participated in a number of international tournaments. At the Football 7-a-side International Tournament in Portugal in 2011, Canada played four games. They defeated Portugal 7–0. They lost to the Netherlands 0–4. They defeated Mexico 3–2. They lost to the Netherlands 1–3. Six teams participated in the Toronto hosted American Cup in 2014. Group A included Venezuela, Argentina and Canada.  Group B included Mexico, Brazil and the United States. The tournament was important for preparations for the 2015 Parapan American Games, and because it was the last major continental level competition of the year. The team was scheduled to participate in the 2016 IFCPF Qualification Tournament World Championships in Vejen, Denmark in early August.  The tournament was part of the qualifying process for the 2017 IFCPF World Championships. Other teams scheduled to participate included Scotland,  Portugal, Iran, Northern Ireland, Australia, Venezuela, Japan, Republic of South Korea, Germany, Denmark, and Spain.

Canada has also played in a number of friendlies. In December 2011, Canada and the United States played a series of three friendly matches in Chula Vista, California.  Canada won the opener 4 - 2.  They then repeated this score in the second match.  The United States won the third game 2 - 3.

In 2011, Canada finished with a record of eight wins and five losses in international play.

IFCPF World Championships 
Canada has participated in the IFCPF World Championships. At the 2011 CP-ISRA World Championship in Drenthe, the Netherlands, Canada defeated Finland 6 - 0,  Canada lost to Ukraine 0 - 5, Canada lost to Scotland 1 - 4, Canada beat Spain 3 - 2, Canada lost to Ireland 0 - 6 and Canada lost to Australia 0 - 2.

Paralympic Games 
Canada has participated in 7-a-side football at the Paralympic Games.  The team tried to qualify for the 2012 Summer Paralympics but were unable to do so.

References 

Palsy
Canada at the Paralympics
National cerebral palsy football teams
Football 7-a-side teams at the 1984 Summer Paralympics